Civil War is an upcoming epic action film written and directed by Alex Garland.

Cast
 Kirsten Dunst
 Wagner Moura
 Stephen McKinley Henderson
 Cailee Spaeny
 Karl Glusman
 Sonoya Mizuno
 Jonica T. Gibbs
 Jess Matney
 Alif Satar

Production
It was announced in January 2022 that Alex Garland would write and direct the film for A24, with Kirsten Dunst, Wagner Moura, Stephen McKinley Henderson and Cailee Spaeny cast to star. Karl Glusman would be announced as part of the cast in April. In a May interview with The Daily Telegraph, Garland described the film as a companion piece to Men, and stated it is "set at an indeterminate point in the future – just far enough ahead for me to add a conceit" – and serves as a sci-fi allegory for our currently polarised predicament". In the same interview, Sonoya Mizuno was revealed as part of the cast.

Filming began in Atlanta on March 15, 2022. By May, production had moved to London.

References

External links
Civil War at the Internet Movie Database

Upcoming films
American action films
A24 (company) films
DNA Films films
Films shot in Atlanta
Films shot in London
Films directed by Alex Garland
Upcoming English-language films